Crews Hill is an elevated and green-buffered former hamlet grown into a small village-size community on the northern outskirts of London centred  north of Charing Cross. It forms part of the London Borough of Enfield and economically has many garden centres and plant nurseries.  It is the northernmost settlement in the entire county of Greater London bordering the M25 and the Welwyn Hatfield district of Hertfordshire to the north; it was historically part of the county of Middlesex.

Etymology 
Named from its association with the Crew family, mentioned in local records of the mid-18th century.

Transport

Crews Hill is served by Crews Hill railway station with trains to Hertford North, Stevenage, in the north, and Moorgate the south. Starting in 2021, bus route 456 connects Crews Hill to the North Middlesex Hospital via Enfield Chase and Winchmore Hill.

Demography
Crews Hill is part of the large Chase ward, which also covers Botany Bay, Clay Hill and Bulls Cross. The 2011 census showed that 77% of the ward's population was white (64% British, 11% Other, 2% Irish). 5% was Black African and 3% Black Caribbean.

Places of interest

Nearby, there is Crews Hill Golf Course, which dates from 1916. John White, the Tottenham Hotspur and Scotland national football team player, was killed by lightning while sheltering under a tree at the golf course on 21 July 1964.

On Whitewebbs Lane there is the Whitewebbs Museum of Transport.

Further up the road is Whitewebbs Park. This is a country park and includes the Enfield Municipal Golf Course.

Crews Hill originally had a large area of glasshouse production, to serve the nearby London market with cut flowers, pot plants   and vegetables. As this became less economic, these sites transformed into a number of garden centres and retail nurseries. Describing the horticultural output of Crews Hill, journalist Ian Jack wrote: "The greenhouses at Crews Hill ('Britain's horticultural mile') used to supply London with flowers and salads. Then came garden centres. Now there are warehouses filled with flowers, chilled at a permanent 7C, the same temperature that has kept them fresh in the six-hour lorry and rail journey through the tunnel from the auctions in Holland."

Turkey Brook flows through Crews Hill.

References

Note

External links

 Crews Hill Residents Association
 Crews Hill Golf Club from 1916
 Crews Hill Guide
 Parks around Enfield including Whitewebbs Park 
 Whitewebbs Museum of Transport
 Transport in the South East

 
Places in Enfield, London
Villages in London
Areas of London
Districts of the London Borough of Enfield
Places formerly in Middlesex